The Sierra de Lema is an upland mountain range area with tepuis, located in  Bolívar state of southeastern Venezuela.

The names Sierra Rinocote and Sierra Usupamo have historically been applied to its eastern and western portions, respectively.

Geography
The Sierra de Lema is geologically part of the Guayana Shield, and biogeographically part of the Guayana Highlands.

Lying north of the Gran Sabana, it marks the drainage divide between the Caroní River and Cuyuni River drainage basins. It is partly within the bounds of Canaima National Park and encompasses a number of prominent tepuis, including the entire Los Testigos chain and Ptari Massif.

Because the toponymy of the region remains largely unresolved, the stated length of the Sierra de Lema can vary widely, depending on the definition used.

The extent of the range exceeds  if the entire chain separating the Caroní and Cuyuni drainage basins is included. By the latter definition, the Sierra de Lema stretches from Cerro Venamo in the east to Serranía Supamo and Cerro Santa Rosa (mountain) in the west, very close to the confluence of the Paragua River and Caroní River.

Ecology
The old-growth forest section of the Sierra de Lema, in the Guayanan Highlands moist forests ecoregion, remains virtually intact. It is characterised by nutrient poor soils with a low pH and high aluminium content.

The El Mirador ("The Lookout") area at the base of the Sierra de Lema exhibits unusually high levels of the radioisotope Caesium-137, in both its soils and vegetation. This is likely related to the ground composition and cloud forest conditions of the site. The undulating, forested landscape of La Escalera ("The Staircase") also forms part of the Sierra de Lema.

Geology
The Sierra de Lema consists of an igneous-metamorphic basement overlain by Precambrian sedimentary rocks of the Roraima Group, with Mesozoic diabase intrusions.

See also
 
 Distribution of Heliamphora — with species endemic-native to the Sierra de Lema.

References

Further reading

 Aymard Corredor, G.A. & E. Sanoja (December 2012). A new species of Ormosia (Leguminosae: Papilionoideae, Sophoreae) from the Guayana Shield, Bolivar State, Venezuela. Harvard Papers in Botany 17(2): 275–279. 
  Barrio-Amorós, C.L. & W.E. Duellman (2010). Anfibios y reptiles de la Sierra de Lema, Venezuela. Parte I: Anuros de las familias Bufonidae e Hylidae. Reptilia: revista especializada en reptiles, anfibios y artrópodos 82: 26–33.
  Barrio-Amorós, C.L. & W.E. Duellman (2010). Anfibios y reptiles de la Sierra de Lema, Venezuela. Parte II: Anuros de las familias Centrolenidae, Dentrobatidae, Leptodactylidae, Microhylidae y Pipidae. Reptilia: revista especializada en reptiles, anfibios y artrópodos 83: 64–70.
  Barrio-Amorós, C.L. & W.E. Duellman (2010). Anfibios y reptiles de la Sierra de Lema, Venezuela. Parte III: Saurios y quelonios terrestres. Reptilia: revista especializada en reptiles, anfibios y artrópodos 84: 32–38.
  Barrio-Amorós, C.L. & W.E. Duellman (2010). Anfibios y reptiles de la Sierra de Lema, Venezuela. Parte IV: Ofidios. Reptilia: revista especializada en reptiles, anfibios y artrópodos 85: 55–61.
  Barrio-Amorós, C.L., C. Brewer-Carías & O. Fuentes-Ramos (31 April 2011). Aproximación preliminar a la herpetocenosis de un bosque pluvial en la sección occidental de la Sierra de Lema, Guayana Venezolana. Revista de Ecología Latinoamericana 16(1): 1–46.
  Brewer-Carías, C. (2007). La Sierra de Lema. Fundación Wonken, Caracas.
 De Marmels, J. (1983). The Odonata of the region of Mount Auyantepui and the Sierra de Lema, in Venezuelan Guyana. 3. Additions to the families Gomphidae, Aeshnidae and Corduliidae, with description of Progomphus racenisi spec. nov.. Odonatologica 12(1): 1–13.
  Durán Rangel, C. (2001). Estructura y composición florística de los bosques de Sierra de Lema, con especial énfasis en Pourouma bolivarensis C.C. Berg. Internship report, Universidad de los Andes, Mérida.
 Durán Rangel, C. & A. Reif (February 2006). Cloud forest gap structure in Sierra de Lema, Gran Sabana, Venezuela. In: I Congreso Internacional de Biodiversidad del Escudo Guayanés: Programa y Libro de Resúmenes. Universidad Nacional Experimental de Guayana, Puerto Ordaz. p. 99.
  Echagaray, M. & L. Aguirre (2003). Dinámica y crecimiento en bosques en un gradiente climático desde Sierra de Lema hasta la Gran Sabana. Una red de parcelas permanentes. Degree thesis, Universidad Nacional Experimental de Guayana, Puerto Ordaz.
  Hernández, L. (2005). Crecimiento diamétrico de árboles en bosques a lo largo de un gradiente climático entre Sierra de Lema y la Gran Sabana: resultados preliminares. Saber, supplement 17: 213–214.
  Hernández, L. & J. Ortíz (2004). Avances del estudio sobre dinámica de bosques a lo largo de un gradiente climático entre Sierra de Lema y la Gran Sabana. In: Memorias IV Congreso Forestal Venezolano: Bosque Vida y Desarrollo. Ministerio del Ambiente y de los Recursos Naturales, Barinas.
  Hernández, L., E. Sanoja, L. Salazar, H. Durán & M. Echagaray (February 2006). Monitoreo de comunidades boscosas a lo largo de un gradiente climático al sudeste de la Guayana Venezolana. [Forest community monitoring along a climatic gradient in the southeast of the Venezuelan Guayana.] In: I Congreso Internacional de Biodiversidad del Escudo Guayanés: Programa y Libro de Resúmenes. Universidad Nacional Experimental de Guayana, Puerto Ordaz. p. 93.
  Hernández, L. & H. Castellanos (November 2006). Crecimiento diamétrico arbóreo en bosques de Sierra de Lema, Guayana Venezolana: primeras evaluaciones. [Tree diameter growth in forests at Sierra de Lema, Venezuelan Guayana: initial evaluations.] Interciencia 31(11): 779–786.
  Hernández, L., E. Sanoja, C. Durán, J. Ayala, J. Ortíz, L. Salazar, M. Echagaray, N. Dezzeo, W. Meier, L. Aguirre, P Rodríguez, J.C. González, L. Delgado, G. Rodríguez & H. Castellanos (2011). Estudio a largo plazo de la dinámica de bosques en un gradiente altitudinal al sudeste de la Guayana Venezolana. BioLlania Edición Especial 10: 63–73.
 Keller, R. (February 2006). Identifying trees of the Sierra de Lema (State of Bolívar) by means of bark characteristics and using a laptop computer application. In: I Congreso Internacional de Biodiversidad del Escudo Guayanés: Programa y Libro de Resúmenes. Universidad Nacional Experimental de Guayana, Puerto Ordaz. pp. 140–141.
  Lew, D. & R. Pérez-Hernández (2004) ['2003']. Una nueva especie del género Monodelphis (Didelphimorphia: Didelphidae) de la Sierra de Lema, Venezuela. [A new species of the genus Monodelphis (Didelphimorphia: Didelphidae) from Sierra de Lema, Venezuela.] Memoria de la Fundación La Salle de Ciencias Naturales 159–160: 7–25.
  Machado-Allison, A., B. Chernoff, R. Royero-León, F. Mago-Leccia, J. Velázquez, C. Lasso, H. López-Rojas, A. Bonilla-Rivero, F. Provenzano & C. Silvera (January–February 2000). Ictiofauna de la cuenca del Río Cuyuní en Venezuela. Interciencia 25(1): 13–21.
  Méndez, S. (2006). Caracterización anatómica de la madera, con fines de análisis dendrocronológico de 8 especies provenientes de un bosque húmedo premontano alto ubicado en la parte alta de La Escalera, Sierra de Lema, Estado Bolívar. Internship report, Universidad Nacional Experimental de Guayana, Puerto Ordaz.
  Mujica, N. (2007). Determinación de la densidad de madera de especies arbóreas un bosque nublado de La escalera (Sierra de Lema). Degree thesis, Universidad Nacional Experimental de Guayana, Puerto Ordaz.
  Ortíz G., J.C. (November 2002). Ensayo de técnicas dendrocronológicas en los géneros tachigali y terminalia en bosques semideciduos y siempre-verdes de tierras bajas entre el Dorado y Sierra de Lema, Estado Bolívar. Degree thesis, Universidad Nacional Experimental de Guayana, Puerto Ordaz.
  Ortiz, J., E. Sanoja & S. Méndez (February 2006). Caracterización anatómica de 8 especies con fines de análisis dendrocronológico del bosque húmedo premontano alto ubicado en la parte alta de Sierra de Lema, Estado Bolívar. [Anatomical characterization of 8 species with the intention of dendrochronological analysis of a high premontan humid forest in the upper Sierra de Lema, State of Bolívar.] In: I Congreso Internacional de Biodiversidad del Escudo Guayanés: Programa y Libro de Resúmenes. Universidad Nacional Experimental de Guayana, Puerto Ordaz. p. 207.
  Rácenis, J. (May–August 1968). Los odonatos de la región del Auyantepui y de la Sierra de Lema, en la Guayana Venezolana. 1. Superfamilia Agrionoidea. Memoria de la Sociedad de Ciencias Naturales La Salle 28(80): 151–176.
  Rácenis, J. (1970). Los odonatos de la región del Auyantepui y de la Sierra de Lema, en la Guayana Venezolana. 2. Las familias Gomphidae, Aeshnidae y Corduliidae. Acta Biologica Venezuelica 7(1): 23–39.
  Rodríguez, P. (February 2008). Inventario dendrológico de bosques a lo largo de un gradiente altitudinal en La Escalera, Sierra de Lema. Degree thesis, Universidad Nacional Experimental de Guayana, Puerto Ordaz.
  Sanoja, E. (2004). Diagnosis y observaciones sobre la biología de Catostemma lemense, nueva Bombacaceae de Venezuela. [Diagnosis and observations on the biology of Catostemma lemense, new Bombacaceae of Venezuela.] Acta Botánica Venezuelica 27(2): 83–94.
  Sanoja, E. (2008). Caracterización fisonómica y dendrológica de bosques montanos en La Escalera, Sierra de Lema, Estado Bolívar. Promotion research study, UUniversidad Nacional Experimental de Guayana, Puerto Ordaz.
  Sanoja, E., L. Hernández, B. Holst, W. Díaz, M. Calzadilla & L. Salazar (February 2006). Estado actual del conocimiento dedrotaxonómico de los bosques premontanos de La Escalera, Sierra de Lema, Estado Bolívar - Venezuela. [Actual status of dedrotaxonomic knowledge of La Escalera premontan forests, Sierra de Lema, State of Bolívar - Venezuela.] In: I Congreso Internacional de Biodiversidad del Escudo Guayanés: Programa y Libro de Resúmenes. Universidad Nacional Experimental de Guayana, Puerto Ordaz. pp. 139–140.
  Sanoja, E. (June 2009). Lista dendrológica de los bosques montanos de La Escalera, Sierra de Lema, Estado Bolívar, Venezuela. [Dendrological list of montane forests of La Escalera, Sierra de Lema, Bolivar State, Venezuela.] Acta Botánica Venezuelica 32(1): 79–111.
  Sanoja, E. (December 2009). Nueva especie de Zanthoxylum L. (Rutaceae) de Sierra de Lema, Estado Bolívar, Venezuela. [A new species of Zanthoxylum L. (Rutaceae) from Sierra de Lema, Bolívar state, Venezuela.] Acta Botánica Venezuelica 32(2): 303–310.
 Steyermark, J.A., S. Nilsson & collaborators (1962). Botanical novelties in the region of Sierra de Lema, Estado Bolívar, Venezuela – I. Boletín de la Sociedad Venezolana de Ciencias Naturales 23(101): 59–95.

 Steyermark, J.A. (1966). Botanical novelties in the region of Sierra de Lema, Estado Bolívar, Venezuela – III. Boletín de la Sociedad Venezolana de Ciencias Naturales 26(110): 411–452.

External links
  La Sierra de Lema una bisagra de vida by Charles Brewer-Carías

Mountain ranges of Venezuela
Guayana Highlands
Landforms of Bolívar (state)
Tepuis of Venezuela